"I Love You" is a song by Swedish dance music duo Axwell & Ingrosso featuring American rapper Kid Ink. The song samples the 1997 song "Bitter Sweet Symphony" by the Verve and also features uncredited vocals from Madison Love, who is also one of the co-writers of the song. The song was released on 10 February 2017 as the eighth single from their debut studio album More Than You Know.

Music video
The music video was released on 8 March 2017 and directed by Colin Tilley.

Track listing

Charts

Weekly charts

Year-end charts

Certifications

Release history

See also
List of Billboard Dance Club Songs number ones of 2017

References

2017 singles
2017 songs
Axwell & Ingrosso songs
Kid Ink songs
Music videos directed by Colin Tilley
Songs written by Axwell
Songs written by Kid Ink
Songs written by Madison Love
Songs written by Sebastian Ingrosso